Impax may refer to:
 IMPAX (software), a brand of software
 Impax Asset Management Group, a British company
 Impax Environmental Markets, a British company
 Impax Laboratories, an American company